Andreas Nilsen Rygg (15 August 1868 – 21 September 1951) was a Norwegian-American journalist, newspaper editor and author. He is most associated with his 1941 study, Norwegians in New York 1825–1925.

Background
Andreas Nilsen Rygg was born in Stavanger in Rogaland, Norway. He was a brother of Nicolai Rygg,  Governor of the Central Bank of Norway. In 1888, the 20-year-old Rygg immigrated to the United States and located in Chicago.

Selected works 
 Norwegians in New York 1825–1925 (1941)
 A Survey of American Relief Work For Norway During and After The Second World War  (1947)

References

Further reading
 Lovoll, Odd S. (2010)  Norwegian Newspapers in America: Connecting Norway and the New Land (Minnesota Historical Society) 
  Gotaas, Thor; Roger Kvarsvik (2010) Ørkenen Sur: den norske uteliggerkolonien i Brooklyn (Oslo: Spartacus)  

1868 births
1951 deaths
Journalists from New York City
Writers from Brooklyn
Writers from Chicago
American newspaper publishers (people)
Norwegian emigrants to the United States
Chicago-Kent College of Law alumni
People from Stavanger
Recipients of the St. Olav's Medal